North-Western Rhodesia, in south central Africa, was a territory administered from 1891 until 1899 under charter by the British South Africa Company. In 1890 the British South Africa Company signed a treaty with King Lewanika of the Barotse, one of the most powerful traditional rulers in the territory. The treaty did not confer protectorate status on the territory, as only the British government could confer that status. Nonetheless, the charter gave the territory protection. 
   
The territory consisted of the western half of present-day Zambia up to the Kafue River, its border with North-Eastern Rhodesia. Later the border between the two chartered territories was moved east, but the distinction did not have any great implications.

In 1899 North-Western Rhodesia was amalgamated with Barotseland to form Barotziland-North-Western Rhodesia, an official British protectorate.  In 1911 Barotziland-North-Western Rhodesia was amalgamated with North-Eastern Rhodesia to form Northern Rhodesia. Today this is the Republic of Zambia.

See also

 British South Africa Company
 Company rule in Rhodesia
 Rhodesia (name)
 Northern Rhodesia

References

Northern Rhodesia
British South Africa Company
Former British colonies and protectorates in Africa
History of Rhodesia
History of Zambia
States and territories established in 1891
States and territories disestablished in 1899
1891 establishments in Africa
1899 disestablishments in Africa
1891 establishments in the British Empire
1899 disestablishments in the British Empire